The Zeus of Otricoli is an Ancient Roman bust found in Otricoli in 1775 during the excavation financed by Pope Pius VI. It is on display in the Sala Rotonda of the Pio-Clementine Vatican Museum.

The bust is presumed to be a Roman copy of a Hellenistic original. While some attributed the bust as a copy of the statue of Phidias at Olympia, numismatic reproductions of that famous statue would suggest otherwise. It appears to be more likely from subsequent centuries.

The Zeus of Otricoli was copied, making it the head of God the Father, by the baroque sculptor Stephan Schwaner, who made statues for the attic of the Holy Trinity Church in Warsaw. The figure of God the Father is currently placed on the battlefield of Raszyn in Falenty, Poland.

References

Sculptures of the Vatican Museums
Roman copies of 4th-century BC Greek sculptures
Busts in Italy
Sculptures of men in Italy